Koeri is an uninhabited village in Lääneranna Parish, Pärnu County, in southwestern Estonia.

References

Villages in Pärnu County
Former villages